The 2003 Amstel Gold Race was the 38th edition of the road bicycle race "Amstel Gold Race", held on Sunday April 20, 2003 in the Limburg province, The Netherlands. The race stretched 250.7 kilometres, with the start in Maastricht and the finish in Valkenburg. There were a total number of 197 competitors, with 122 of them finishing the race.

Result

External links

Amstel Gold Race
Amstel Gold Race
2003 in Dutch sport
2003 in road cycling
April 2003 sports events in Europe